State Route 16 is a primary state highway in the southwest part of the U.S. state of Virginia. It runs from the North Carolina border at North Carolina Highway 16 north to the West Virginia border at West Virginia Route 16, passing through the towns of Troutdale, Marion, and Tazewell. Highway 16 is part of a three-state route 16 that connects the Charlotte region with northwestern West Virginia.

Route description

Grayson County
SR 16 begins at the North Carolina state line near the community of Grassy Creek, where North Carolina Highway 16 ends. (Mayberry Road/State Route 856, the old alignment of SR 16, crosses a bit to the east, and quickly joins SR 16.) SR 16 heads in a general east-northeasterly direction alongside minor creeks until it reaches Wilson Creek. It crosses that creek and heads east (downstream) alongside it to the junction with U.S. Route 58 at Mouth of Wilson.

SR 16 and US 58 overlap northwest from Mouth of Wilson next to a minor creek and then next to Wilson Creek, this time heading upstream. At Volney, US 58 turns west, along with Wilson Creek, and SR 16 continues uphill, northward and northwestward past Grant and Troutdale, to its crossing of the Tennessee Valley Divide at Dickey Gap between Hurricane Mountain and Straight Mountain in the Iron Mountains.

Smyth County
Soon after crossing the divide, State Route 650, once the alignment of U.S. Route 58, splits off to the west, while SR 16 heads northeast and downhill to Sugar Grove. After a flat area near Sugar Grove, SR 16 again heads uphill, north and northwest across Brushy Mountain and the Appalachian Trail. It then runs northwest, following Staley Creek downhill past Attoway and Furnace Hill and through several gaps into Marion. Between Sugar Grove and Trout Dale(Grayson County) SR 16 share a routing concurrency with US Bicycle Route 76.

SR 16 enters the town of Marion on Commerce Street, meeting Interstate 81 and then State Route 217 (the Southwestern Virginia Mental Health Institute driveways). At Main Street (U.S. Route 11), SR 16 turns northeast, overlapping US 11 out of downtown to Park Boulevard. There it turns northwest to the city limits.

The road again heads uphill, passing the west shore of Hungry Mother Lake and the entrance to Hungry Mother State Park (State Route 348). SR 16 crosses Walker Mountain in a curving route, coming down into the Rich Valley and crossing the North Fork Holston River at Chatham Hill and State Route 42 soon after at Black Hill. Again SR 16 heads uphill, climbing Brushy Mountain to the county line.

Tazewell County
Another twisty descent takes SR 16 down Brushy Mountain into the Freestone Valley, but almost immediately it must rise again to cross Clinch Mountain. This time, a single hairpin turn takes it into the wide Thompson Valley, where it passes the community of Thompson Valley. A gap between Knob Mountain and Rich Mountain leads to U.S. Route 19/460 Business at Frog Level, just east of the north end of State Route 91.

SR 16 turns northeast along US 19/460 Business into Tazewell, meeting the State Route 16 Alternate (Fairground Road) shortcut along the way. The overlapped routes pass through downtown Tazewell on Main Street and Fincastle Turnpike; SR 16 then splits to the northwest on Tazewell Avenue. It crosses the U.S. Route 19/U.S. Route 460 bypass of Tazewell on its way to the west end of State Route 61 at North Tazewell, still inside the town of Tazewell. SR 16 turns west where it meets SR 61, paralleling the Clinch River to the north end of SR 16 Alternate at River Jack. There it turns north and leaves Tazewell.

SR 16 begins to rise again, passing Adria on its way to the community of Stony Ridge, then crossing the Tennessee Valley Divide again there. The road then descends the ridge to the northwest, crossing into West Virginia and becoming West Virginia Route 16 near the community of Bishop.

Back of the Dragon

The section of SR 16 that passes between Marion and Tazewell is called the Back of the Dragon. It is a noted route of  that has several hundred sharp turns, scenic overlooks and is a favorite of bicycle, motorcycle and sports car enthusiasts from several countries.

Larry Brent Davidson spearheaded the naming of this section of the road because the route reminded him of the humps on the back of a dragon.

The turn count varies considerably with estimates of between 260 and 438 turns.

Loose gravel, fallen rocks, agricultural trucks and vehicles suddenly coming out on the road, has led to 12 crashes, 13 injuries and no fatalities between 2013 and 2018, according to the Virginia Department of Motor Vehicles.

History
One of the first two pieces of current SR 16 to be added to the state highway system was the road from Mouth of Wilson north to State Route 650 (Comers Creek Road) north of Troutdale, which was part of State Route 12 (the predecessor to U.S. Route 58) by 1923. Part of this, from Mouth of Wilson to Volney, still carries US 58.

At the other end, the State Highway Commission recommended that the General Assembly add the road from Tazewell north to North Tazewell to the state highway system in late 1921, as part of a relocation of State Route 11 (now U.S. Route 19/U.S. Route 460) to serve North Tazewell rather than Tazewell. The relocation was not made, but the spur and its continuation north to West Virginia was added, and was numbered State Route 117 in the 1923 renumbering. (The current route of US 19/US 460 does bypass Tazewell on much the same alignment as the SHC recommended.)

By 1927, SR 117 had become part of State Route 105, which continued south from Tazewell to Glade Spring along current State Route 91. This part of SR 16 north of Tazewell, along with the road south to Glade Spring, was renumbered State Route 112 in the 1928 renumbering and State Route 81 in the 1933 renumbering, not being split at Tazewell until 1940.

In 1928, the next piece of SR 16, running north and south from State Route 10 (now U.S. Route 11 in Marion,  in each direction, was added to the state highway system as State Route 113. In 1932, a  piece on the other side of Brushy Mountain was added, from SR 11 near Tazewell south to SR 602 (Pleasant Hill Church Road) at Criggers.

Both pieces of SR 113 - through Marion and south from Tazewell - became State Route 88 in the 1933 renumbering. In 1933 and 1934, the Marion section was extended north to State Route 42. The final piece in Smyth County was added in 1936; the gap in Tazewell County was filled in 1937 and 1938.

The whole piece of present SR 16 from State Route 12 (now U.S. Route 58) at Mouth of Wilson southwest to North Carolina Highway 681 (now North Carolina Highway 16) was added in 1931 as State Route 139. It was renumbered State Route 92 in the 1933 renumbering.

In the 1940 renumbering, the present route of State Route 16 was assigned over all of SR 92 and SR 88 and the part of SR 81 north of Tazewell. (The rest of SR 81 was simultaneously renumbered State Route 91, and U.S. Route 58 was removed from the Volney-Troutdale piece of SR 16.) At the same time, North Carolina Highway 681 and West Virginia Route 12 were renumbered as North Carolina Highway 16 and West Virginia Route 16, forming a three-state route.

Major intersections

SR 16 Alternate

State Route 16 Alternate is a primary state highway in and near the town of Tazewell, Virginia, United States. It is an alternate route of State Route 16, with both ends in Tazewell; the route is shorter than staying on SR 16 through Tazewell.

SR 16 Alternate begins at SR 16 where it overlaps U.S. Route 19/460 Business in southwestern Tazewell. It generally heads northwest, leaving the town before interchanging with the U.S. Route 19/U.S. Route 460 bypass. SR 16 Alternate re-enters Tazewell, crossing the Clinch River before ending at SR 16 in the River Jack area of Tazewell.

SR 16 Alternate was added to the primary state highway system in 1953; it had been secondary State Route 631.

References

Further reading

External links

Virginia Highways Project: VA 16
 Back of the Dragon.
 Facebook page for the back of the dragon
 Virginia is for Lovers, BackoftheDragon
 Youtube.com "Back of the Dragon VA SR 16 1.1". Abstract: Running from Tazewell to Marion VA, Virginia's State Road # 16 is 32 miles of switchbacks and sweepers climbing and descending multiple mountains. Promoted by the locals as "The Back of the Dragon," it lives up to its billing. If you like the more famous "Tail of the Dragon" at Deal's Gap in NC/TN, you owe it to yourself to come experience this world class motorcycle road.

016
State Route 016
State Route 016
State Route 016